III Zw 2 is a rapidly-rotating quasar located in the Seyfert galaxy Messier 106 in the constellation Canes Venatici, containing a stellar black hole. Approximately every five years it emits dramatic radio outbursts.

References

Canes Venatici
Quasars